FAC may refer to:

Arts 
 Faisalabad Arts Council, in Pakistan
 Featured Artists' Coalition, a British music organization
 Fine Arts Center (disambiguation), for several uses
 Firehall Arts Centre, in Vancouver, British Columbia, Canada
 Fremont Arts Council, in Seattle, Washington, United States

Education 
 Federation autonome du collegial, a Canadian teachers union
 Flawn Academic Center, of the University of Texas at Austin
 Florida Agricultural College, now the University of Florida

Government and politics 
 Asturias Forum, a political party in Asturias, Spain
 Catalan Liberation Front
 Federal Administrative Court (disambiguation)
 Federal Advisory Council, part of the United States Federal Reserve System
 Federal Airports Corporation, a former Australian government enterprise
 Federal Audit Clearinghouse, a government office within the United States government
 Firearms certificate, in the United Kingdom
 Florida Administrative Code
 Foreign Affairs Canada
 Foreign Affairs Council, of the European Union

Advocacy groups 
 Feminists Against Censorship, in the United Kingdom
 First Amendment Center, in the United States
 Florida Action Committee

Military 
 Canadian Armed Forces
 Cameroonian Armed Forces
 Colombian Air Force
 Fast attack craft
 Forças Armadas de Cabinda, an Angolan paramilitary group
 Forces Armées Congolaise, now the Armed Forces of the Democratic Republic of the Congo
 Forward air control

Sport 
 Andorran Cycling Federation
 FA Cup, an English football competition
 Famalicense Atlético Clube, a Portuguese sports club
 Floridsdorfer AC, an Austrian football club

Science and technology 
 FAC-System, a mechanical construction set
 Familial amyloid cardiomyopathy
 Fanconi anemia, complementation group C
 Faisceaux algébriques cohérents, a mathematics paper sometimes referred to as 'FAC'
 Field-aligned current
 Flow-accelerated corrosion
 Formal Aspects of Computing, a scholarly journal
 Facial isomer of octahedral complexes; see fac–mer isomerism
 Flight augmentation computers of the A320

Other uses 
 Faaite Airport, in French Polynesia
 Face-amount certificate company

See also 
 FAQ